In human anatomy, iliac vein refers to several anatomical structures located in the pelvis:

 Common iliac vein, formed by the external and internal iliac veins, drains into the inferior vena cava
 Deep circumflex iliac vein, formed by the union of the venae comitantes of the deep iliac circumflex artery, and joins the external iliac vein
 External iliac vein, terminates at the common iliac vein, drains the femoral vein
 Internal iliac vein, terminates at the common iliac vein, drains pelvic organs and perineum

Perineum
Pelvis
Veins